KRTA (610 AM) is a radio station broadcasting a Spanish music format. Licensed to Medford, Oregon, United States, the station serves the Medford-Ashland area.  The station is currently owned by Opus Broadcasting Systems.

References

External links

FCC History Cards for KRTA

RTA
RTA
Regional Mexican radio stations in the United States
Medford, Oregon
1947 establishments in Oregon